Polikarpov DI-1 (DI - Dvukhmesnyy Istrebitel - two-seat fighter), also known as 2I-N1, was a prototype Soviet two-seat fighter designed during the 1920s. The sole prototype built crashed on its ninth flight, due to manufacturing defects, and the program was cancelled.

Design and development
Nikolai Nikolaevich Polikarpov began design of a two-seat fighter initially designated as the 2I-N1 (two-seat Istrebitel (fighter) with a single Napier engine) in October 1924 at Zavod (Factory) Nr. 1 at Khodynka Aerodrome, Moscow. It was the first Soviet indigenous two-seat fighter. It was a single-bay biplane with its wings arranged in a sesquiplane configuration. The oval-shaped, semi-monocoque fuselage was made of 'shpon', molded birch plywood. The wings were also covered with 'shpon'. The upper wing had two spars, but the lower wing only had one. Internal bracing wires were not used in the wings as it was built up from plywood ribs with large lightening holes and stringers. V-struts made from Duralumin separated the wings and connected the upper wing to the fuselage. Steel bracing wires were used externally. An airfoil enclosed the axle of the fixed undercarriage and a small ski served as a tailskid. It had an imported  Napier Lion engine enclosed in a metal cowling. It carried  of fuel and oil. The armament consisted of a single fixed  synchronized PV-1 machine gun and a 7.62 mm DA machine gun mounted on a ring in the observer's cockpit.
 
The first flight of the prototype took place on 12 January 1926 and the DI-1, as it was now known, demonstrated excellent performance. Polikarpov himself flew as the observer on the fourth and eighth test flights. However, during the ninth flight on 31 March 1926, the aircraft was making speed runs over the measured kilometer at Khodynka Airfield at a height of  when the upper surface of the right upper wing ripped off, followed by the lower skin. Both right wings then collapsed and the DI-1 crashed, killing both the pilot, V. N. Filippov, and the observer, V. V. Mikhailov.

Examination of the wreckage revealed that large portions of the wings' skin were badly glued and that a number of rib caps and stringers were not glued at all. Many panel pins were not connected to the structure at all and many of the bradawl holes necessary to equalize pressure between the inside of the wing and the outside were missing entirely. The crash of such an advanced aircraft shocked the entire industry and caused a six-month hiatus in design work. Polikarpov overreacted to its loss and built the structure of a number of his subsequent aircraft stronger, and thus, heavier, than it needed to be. All further work on the project was abandoned following the crash, nominally for lack of a suitable engine.

Specifications

References

Further reading

 
 

DI-1
1920s Soviet and Russian fighter aircraft
Sesquiplanes
Aircraft first flown in 1926